San Antonio is a district of the Escazú canton, in the San José province of Costa Rica.

Geography 
San Antonio has an area of  km² and an elevation of  metres.

Demographics 

For the 2011 census, San Antonio had a population of  inhabitants.

Locations
San Antonio is one of the higher towns in the city. It has a traditional church with a square and football field in the center surrounded by the majority of its local shops and businesses.

Transportation

Road transportation 
The district is covered by the following road routes:
 National Route 105

References 

Districts of San José Province
Populated places in San José Province